Courts of Hawaii include:
;State courts of Hawaii
Hawaii State Supreme Court
Hawaii Intermediate Court of Appeals
Hawaii state circuit courts (4 circuits)
Hawaii State family courts (4 circuits)
Hawaii state district courts (including Small Claims Court)
Hawaii State Land Court
Hawaii Tax Appeal Court

Federal courts located in Hawaii
United States District Court for the District of Hawaii

References

External links
National Center for State Courts – directory of state court websites.

Courts in the United States